The discography of Canadian singer-songwriter Alexandra Hughes, better known as Allie X, consists of two studio albums, two live albums, two independently released demo album, six extended plays, and 31 singles. Hughes began her career in the underground club scene in Toronto, independently releasing the 10-track demo album Waiting for the Prize in 2006. Her debut single under the Allie X name "Catch" was released in 2014, to much critical acclaim. Her debut EP CollXtion I was released on 7 April 2015. After an endorsement from American singer Katy Perry, "Catch" was re-released and began charting in Canada. Hughes spent the next two years working on her debut studio album, releasing numerous singles online to gauge fan reaction. The album, CollXtion II, was released on 9 June 2017 and the singles not included on the project were released as the compilation EP CollXtion II: Unsolved. She released another EP, Super Sunset, on 29 October 2018. Her second studio album Cape God was released on 21 February 2020 and became her first album to chart in the United States.

In addition to her own music, Allie X has written songs for other artists including Troye Sivan, Betty Who, BTS, and Leland.

Albums

Studio albums

Compilation albums

Live albums

Demo albums

Extended plays

Singles

As lead artist

As featured artist

Music videos

Songwriting credits

Notes

References

Discography
Discographies of Canadian artists
Pop music discographies